Pythium deliense is a plant pathogen infecting potato and beet.

References

External links
 Index Fungorum
 USDA ARS Fungal Database

Water mould plant pathogens and diseases
Potato diseases
Root vegetable diseases
deliense
Species described in 1934